The Chinese Civil War was a conflict from 1927–36 and 1946–50.

Chinese Civil War may also refer to:

Modern conflicts
Taiping Rebellion (1850–64)
Xinhai Revolution (1911–12) 
Second Revolution (1913)
National Protection War (1915–16)
Constitutional Protection War (1917–18)
Zhili–Anhui War (1920)
Guangdong–Guangxi War (1920–21)
First Zhili–Fengtian War (1922)
Second Zhili–Fengtian War (1924)
Yunnan–Guangxi War (1925)
Anti-Fengtian War (1925–26)
Northern Expedition (1925–28)
Central Plains War (1930)
Fujian Rebellion (1933–34)
Xinjiang Wars (1933–46)
Violent Struggle (1966-68)

Historic conflicts and periods of conflict
Spring and Autumn period
Warring States period
Chen Sheng rebellion
Chu-Han Contention
Agrarian revolts during Wang Mang's reign
Yellow Turban Rebellion
Three Kingdoms
War of the Eight Princes
Sixteen Kingdoms
Northern & Southern Dynasties
Anshi Rebellion
Divisions of Fanzhen
Huang Chao Rebellion
Five Dynasties & Ten Kingdoms
Jingnan Campaign
Li Zicheng revolt 
Zhang Xianzhong rebellion

See also
Chinese Revolution (disambiguation)
History of China
List of Chinese wars and battles
List of rebellions in China